Serge Yuryevich Ivanov (born 16 June 1984) is a former professional association football player from Russia.

Club career
He made his professional debut in the Russian Second Division in 2001 for FC Lokomotiv-Zenit-2 St. Petersburg. He played 1 game in the UEFA Cup 2002–03 for FC Zenit St. Petersburg.

Honours
Russian Premier League Cup winner: 2003

References

1984 births
Footballers from Saint Petersburg
Living people
Russian footballers
Russia under-21 international footballers
Association football goalkeepers
FC Zenit Saint Petersburg players
FC Spartak Vladikavkaz players
FC Vityaz Podolsk players
Russian Premier League players
FC Zenit-2 Saint Petersburg players
FC Spartak Nizhny Novgorod players